Pirinçli is a village in the Şirvan District of Siirt Province in Turkey. The village is populated by Kurds of the Berojî tribe and had a population of 338 in 2021.

The hamlets of Kaniyasaro, Kısraklı and Serinpınar are attached to Pirinçli.

References 

Kurdish settlements in Siirt Province
Villages in Şirvan District